Cho Sun-young (born ) is a South Korean female  track cyclist. She won the silver medal in the  team sprint  at the 2016 Asian Cycling Championships.

Career results
2015
2nd Sprint, Japan Track Cup
2nd Sprint, Yangyang International Track Competition
Track Asia Cup
2nd Keirin
2nd Sprint
2016
2nd  Team Sprint, Asian Track Championships (with Lee Hye-jin)
2017
2nd  500m Time Trial, Asian Track Championships

References

External links
 Profile at cyclingarchives.com

1993 births
Living people
South Korean track cyclists
South Korean female cyclists
Place of birth missing (living people)
Cyclists at the 2018 Asian Games
Medalists at the 2018 Asian Games
Asian Games bronze medalists for South Korea
Asian Games medalists in cycling
20th-century South Korean women
21st-century South Korean women